Albert Wolfgang of Brandenburg-Bayreuth (8 December 1689 in Sulzbürg, now part of Mühlhausen – 29 June 1734 in Parma) was a Margrave of Brandenburg-Bayreuth from the Kulmbach-Bayreuth side line of Franconian branch of the House of Hohenzollern.  He served as a general in the imperial army.

Life 
Wolfgang Albrecht was the second son of Margrave Christian Henry of Brandenburg-Bayreuth (1661-1708) from his marriage to Sophie Christiane (1667-1737), the daughter of Count Albert Frederik of Wolfstein at Sulzbürg.  He and his older brother George Frederick Charles grew up in Bielefeld.  They studied at the University of Utrecht together.  After his Grand Tour, which took him to France, England and Italy, he entered the Imperial service.

During his military career he attained the rank of Lieutenant General.  He and field marshal Claude Florimond de Mercy were killed during an attack on Crocetta castle in Parma.  He was initially buried in Bayreuth; in 1742, his body was transferred to Himmelskron Abbey, where his sister, Queen Sophia Magdalene of Denmark erected a monument to commemorate him.

References 
 Julius Freiherr von Minutoli: Friedrich I., Kurfürst von Brandenburg und Memorabilia aus dem Leben der Markgrafen von Brandenburg aus den Quellen des Plassenburger Archivs, A. Duncker, 1850, p. 94

Generals of the Holy Roman Empire
House of Hohenzollern
1689 births
1734 deaths
Margraves of Brandenburg